Spot blotch is a leaf disease of wheat caused by Cochliobolus sativus. Cochliobolus sativus also infects other plant parts and in conjunction with other pathogens causes common root rot and black point.

Introduction 
Foliar blight, Helminthosporium leaf blight (HLB), or foliar blight has been a major disease of wheat (Triticum aestivum L.) worldwide. Foliar blight disease complex consists of spot blotch and tan spot. Spot blotch is favored in warmer environments, whereas tan spot is favored in cooler environments such as United States.
 The tan spot forms of foliar blight appears in United States causing significant yield loss. With changed climatic conditions the disease is supposed to be increasing in cooler parts of the world. Among foliar blights the tan spot, caused by Pyrenophora tritici-repentis, is the most destructive leaf spot disease found in all wheat classes throughout the growing season across North Dakota.

The spot blotch form of foliar blight is severe particularly in warmer growing areas characterized by an average temperature in the coolest month above 17 °C. In the past 20 years, HLB has been recognized as the major disease constraint to wheat cultivation in the warmer eastern plains of South Asia. About 25 million hectares of nontraditional wheat growing area are under the pressure of the disease.

See: Knowing the Enemy: Foliar Blight

Symptoms 

Early lesions are characterized by small, dark brown lesions 1 to 2 mm long without chlorotic margin. In susceptible genotypes, these lesions extend very quickly in oval to elongated blotches, light brown to dark brown in colour. They may reach several centimetres before coalescing and inducing the death of the leaf. Fruiting structures develop readily under humid conditions and are generally easily observed on old lesions. If spikelets are affected, it can result in shrivelled grain and black point, a dark staining of the embryo end of the seed. The small dark brown spots on the leaves contrast with the larger, light brown spots or blotches produced by tan spot and septoria avenae blotch.

typical spot blotch sysmtom

Crop losses 

In recent years, Helminthosporium leaf blights (HLB), caused by both Cochliobolus sativus and Pyrenophora tritici-repentis, have emerged as serious concerns for wheat cultivation in the developing world. The disease causes significant yield losses overall 22% to complete failure of crop under severe epidemics.

Distribution 
The first observation in Zambia was made in the 2017/8 rainy season by someone from the Zambia Agricultural Research Institute.

Control measures 
The disease is very serious in different parts of the world.  The management of this disease requires an integrative approach.

An integrated approach 
The best way to control Helminthosporium diseases is through an integrated approach. It includes the use of a variety of resistance sources, such as hexaploid wheat from Brazil and China (some of which is rate-limiting), alien genes and synthetic wheats. In addition, appropriate management practices that enhance the health of the plant populations, in general, are critical. Cooperation of pathologists, breeders and agronomists will be necessary to ensure sustainable control of this group of diseases.  Economic feasibility of recommended practices has to be determined as part of the research. Options for controlling tan spot and spot blotch include disease-free seed, seed treatment with fungicides, proper crop rotation and fertilization, cultural practices in order to reduce inoculum sources, the use of chemicals and the research of disease resistance. The latter offers the best long-term control at no cost for the farmer and is ecologically safe.

Seed health 

In Brazil, it is recommended not to plant seed lots with more than 3% black point to limit spot blotch. Seed treatment may prove to be appropriate, although the inoculum remaining on secondary hosts or in the soil may reduce the treatment efficiency. Seed treatments with phytoalexin inducer appeared to provide good protection to wheat seedlings against B. sorokiniana infection. Seed treatment with fungicide will help protect germinating seed and seedlings from fungi causing seedling blights. Fungicide seed treatments include: captan, mancozeb, maneb, thiram, pentachloronitrobenzene (PCNB) or carboxin guazatine plus, iprodione and triadimefon (Stack and McMullen, 1988; Mehta, 1993). Seed-borne inoculum of P. tritici-repentis can be controlled with seed-applied fungicides, such as guazatine and guazatine + imazalil, but other chemicals are also effective.

Rotations and crop management 
Clearing or ploughing in the stubble, grass weeds and volunteer cereals reduce inoculum as does crop rotation (Diehl et al., 1982). Reis et al. (1998) indicate that eradicant fungicide treatment of the seed and crop rotation with non-host crops can control spot blotch. In the rice-wheat system of South Asia, little work has been done on the epidemiology of HLB and how management of the rotation crops affects spot blotch and tan spot, except as noted earlier. More quantitative information is required on the role of alternate rotations, soil and plant nutrition, inoculum sources and climate. In the rice-wheat system, there is a need for timely planting of wheat, better stand establishment and root development, increased soil organic matter, sufficient levels of macro- and micronutrients, and water and weed management (Hobbs et al., 1996; Hobbs and Giri, 1997). Crop rotation and organic manures will play a major role in HLB. This should favour beneficial soil organisms as well as better plant nutrition. In the rice-wheat system, it will be necessary to break the rotation with other crops to make it more sustainable, and this should help reduce disease problems in general. The use of oilseed rape in South Asia is common in mixture with wheat or in rotation. Since rape is known to have some fungitoxic effects upon decay, its effects on HLB would need research (Dubin and Duveiller, 2000). In the HLB complex, rotations would need to be sufficiently long to reduce the amount of soil inoculum. Cook and Veseth (1991) note that the kind of rotation crop may not be so important to root health as the length of time out of wheat. The rotation crops and length of rotation would have to be studied in relation to HLB.

Apparently, sound management recommendations may antagonize specific diseases as in the case of tan spot. Tan spot has been controlled largely by cultural practices, such as rotation with non-host crops and removal or burial of stubble (Rees and Platz, 1992). Bockus and Claassen (1992) observed that rotation to sorghum was as effective as ploughing for control of tan spot, and under certain conditions, crop rotations as short as one year controlled tan spot. In South Asia, recent work by Hobbs and Giri (1997) indicates that minimum tillage may be the best way to reduce turnaround time from rice to wheat and thus permit the planting of wheat more timely. Since this probably increases inoculum of tan spot, it highlights the need for integration of disciplines to determine how best to achieve attainable yields.

Fungicides 

Although pesticide use should be minimized, fungicides have proven useful and economical in the control of tan spot (Loughman et al., 1998) and spot blotch (Viedma and Kohli, 1998). The triazole group (e.g. tebuconazole and propiconazole) especially has proven to be very effective for both HLBs, and their judicious use should not be overlooked. However, it may provide acceptable control but not always economic return in commercial grain production. This is dependent on the price received for the wheat, the price of the fungicide and the percent yield increase from using the fungicide. Situations will differ significantly according to geographical areas and cropping conditions. Spot blotch in particular is a very aggressive disease, and under a favourable environment, spraying at one- to two-week intervals for as long as necessary may be needed to maintain the disease under control.

For general information on management of the disease visit Ohio State University Link and FAO link

Breeding for resistance 

The wheat cultivars of South Asia have only low to moderate levels of resistance to spot blotch. However, genetic variation for resistance has been reported in a few wheat cultivars. The best sources of resistance, to date, were identified in the Brazilian and Zambian wheat lines. Recently, a few Chinese wheat genotypes from the Yangtze River valley were identified with acceptable levels of resistance to spot blotch. The following genotypes has been reported to have satisfactory level of resistance, although complete resistance or immunity is lacking: 

1 SW 89-5193

2 SW 89-3060

3 SW 89-5422

4 Chirya 7

5 Ning 8319

6 NL 781

7 Croc 1/A. sq.// Borl

8 Chirya 3

9 G162

10 Chirya 1

11 Yangmai-6

12 NL 785

The field resistance governed by Chirya-3 and Milan / Shanghai 7 was found under monogenic control 

Similarly resistant genotypes Acc. No. 8226, Mon/Ald, Suzhoe#8 from India are found to possess three genes for resistance.

A study was conducted to determine microsatellite markers associated with resistance in the F7 progeny from a cross between the spot blotch-susceptible Sonalika and resistant G162 wheat genotypes. 15 polymorphic markers showed association with two bulks, one each of progeny with low and with high spot blotch severity.

One of the interesting phenomena associated with foliar blight in some of susceptible cultivars is tolerance (low yield loss even at very high level of disease severity). In addition, the resistance seems to be associated with late maturity (which is an undesirable characteristic as late maturing genotypes need to face more heat stress than early ones), complete understanding of physiological association may aid to complete understanding of the host-pathogen system.

Rosyara et al. reported that the AUDPC showed a significant negative correlation with the width of large vascular bundles, percentage of small vascular bundles with two girders and the number of large veins. Also the AUDPC was positively correlated
with the distance between adjacent vascular bundles and leaf thickness. The chlorophyll or general health indicators, SPAD and AUSDC values were higher in spot blotch resistant and tolerant genotypes. The findings the study underlined the importance of mesophyll structure and chlorophyllcontent in spot blotch resistance in wheat. Also tolerant genotypes responded in the same way as artificial defoliation showing mechanisms of nutrient balance playing role. Similarly, canopy temperature depression was found associated with foliar blight resistance. Leaf tip necrosis was found to be associated with foliar blight resistance and is suggested as phenotypic marker. Different studies are done to estimate heritability
and increase selection efficiency. Heritability estimates were low to high in terms of AUDPC. To increase efficiency of selection use of selection index has been suggested. The index includes days to heading (maturity related trait), thousand kernel weight, and area under foliar blight disease progress curve.

References

Further reading 
 Joshi, A. K.; R. Chand, S. Kumar, and R. P. Singh. 2004. Leaf Tip Necrosis: A Phenotypic Marker Associated with Resistance to Spot Blotch Disease in Wheat. Crop Sci. 44:792–796.
 Joshi A. K., S. Kumar, R. Chand and G. Ortiz-Ferrara 2004. Inheritance of resistance to spot blotch caused by Bipolaris sorokiniana in spring wheat. Plant Breeding 123, 213—219
 Rosyara, U.R., R.C. Sharma, S.M. Shrestha, and E. Duveiller. 2006. Yield and yield components response to defoliation of spring wheat genotypes with different level of resistance to Helminthosporium leaf blight. Journal of Institute of Agriculture and Animal Science 27. 42–48. or
 Adlakha, K.L., Wilcoxson, R.D. & Ray-chauduri, S.P. 1984. Resistance of wheat to spot blotch caused by Bipolaris sorokiniana. Plant Dis., 68: 320–321.
 Alam, K.B., Banu, S.P. & Shaheed, M.A. 1998. The occurrence and significance of spot blotch disease in Bangladesh. In E. Duveiller, H.J. Dubin, J. Reeves & A. McNab, eds. Proc. Int. Workshop Helminthosporium Diseases of Wheat: Spot Blotch and Tan Spot, CIMMYT, El Batan, Mexico, 9–14 Feb 1997, p. 63–66. Mexico, DF, CIMMYT.
 Annone, J. 1998. Tan spot of wheat in Argentina: Importance and prevailing disease management strategies. In E. Duveiller, H.J. Dubin, J. Reeves & A. McNab, eds. Proc. Int. Workshop Helminthosporium Diseases of Wheat: Spot Blotch and Tan Spot, CIMMYT, El Batan, Mexico, 9–14 Feb 1997, p. 339–345. Mexico, DF, CIMMYT.
 Bhatta, M.R., Pokharel, D.R., Devkota, R.N., Dubin, H.J., Mudwari, A., Bimb, H.P., Thapa, B.R., Sah, B.P. & Bhandari, D. 1998. Breeding for Helminthosporium blights resistance in Nepal: strategy followed by the national wheat research program and genetic gains. In E. Duveiller, H.J. Dubin, J. Reeves & A. McNab, eds. Proc. Int. Workshop Helminthosporium Diseases of Wheat: Spot Blotch and Tan Spot, CIMMYT, El Batan, Mexico, 9–14 Feb 1997, p. 188–195. Mexico, DF, CIMMYT.
 Bisen, P.S. & Channy, B. 1983. Some observations on the surface of wheat leaves during the early stages of infection by Helminthosporium sativum. J. Ind. Bot. Soc., 62(3): 285–287.
 Bockus, W.W. & Claassen, M.M. 1992. Effects of crop rotation and residue management practices on severity of tan spot of winter wheat. Plant Dis., 76: 633–636.
 Brûlé-Babel & Lamari, L. 1992. Evaluation of field screening techniques for tan spot resistance in spring wheat. In L.J. Francl, J.M. Krupinsky & M.P McMullen, eds. Advances in Tan Spot Research, Proc. 2nd Int. Tan Spot Workshop, 25–26 Jun 1992, p. 39–43. Fargo, ND, USA, NDSU.
 CIMMYT. 1995. CIMMYT/NARS consultancy on ME1 bread wheat breeding. Wheat Special Report No. 38, p. 25. Mexico, DF.
 Cook, R.J. & Veseth, R.J. 1991. Wheat health management. St Paul, MN, USA, APS Press. 152 pp.
 Couture, L. & Sutton, J.C. 1978. Control of spot blotch in barley by fungicides applications timed according to weather factors. Phytoprotection, 59: 65–75.
 Diehl, J.A., R.D., Tinline, R.D., Kochhann, R.A., Shipton, P.J. & Rovira, A.D. 1982. The effect of fallow periods on common root rot of wheat in Rio Grande do Sul, Brazil. Phytopathology, 72: 1297–1301.
 Di Zinno, T., Longree, H. & Maraite, H. 1998. Diversity of Pyrenophora tritici-repentis isolates from wheat grown in warm areas: pathogenicity, toxin production and RAPD analysis. In E. Duveiller, H.J. Dubin, J. Reeves & A. McNab, eds. Proc. Int. Workshop Helminthosporium Diseases of Wheat: Spot Blotch and Tan Spot, CIMMYT, El Batan, Mexico, 9–14 Feb 1997, p. 302–312. Mexico, DF, CIMMYT.
 Dubin, H.J. & Bimb, H.P. 1994. Studies of soilborne diseases and foliar blights of wheat at the National Wheat Research Experiment Station, Bhairahawa, Nepal. Wheat Special Report No. 36. Mexico, DF, CIMMYT.
 Dubin, H.J. & Duveiller, E. 2000. Helminthosporium leaf blights of wheat: integrated control and prospects for the future. In Proc. Int. Conf. Integrated Plant Disease Management for Sustainable Agriculture, New Delhi, 10–15 Nov 1997, vol. 1, p. 575–579.
 Dubin, H.J. & Rajaram, S. 1996. Breeding disease resistant wheats for tropical highlands and lowlands. Annu. Rev. Phytopathol., 34: 503–526.
 Dubin, H.J. & van Ginkel, M. 1991. The status of wheat diseases and disease research in the warmer areas. In D.A. Saunders & G. Hettel, eds. Proc. Wheat for Nontraditional Warm Areas. Proc. Int. Conf., Foz do Iguazu, Brazil, 29 Jul.-3 Aug 1990, p. 125–145. Mexico, DF, UNDP/CIMMYT.
 Dubin, H.J., Arun, B., Begum, S.N., Bhatta, M., Dhari, R., Goel, L.B., Joshi, A.K., Khanna, B.M., Malaker, P.K., Pokhrel, D.R., Rahman, M.M., Saha, N.K., Sharma, R.C., Singh, A.K., Singh, R.M., Singh, R.V., Vargas, M. & Verma, P.C. 1998. Results of South Asia regional Helminthosporium leaf blight and yield experiment, 1993–1994. In E. Duveiller, H.J. Dubin, J. Reeves & A. McNab, eds. Proc. Int. Workshop Helminthosporium Diseases of Wheat: Spot Blotch and Tan Spot, CIMMYT, El Batan, Mexico, 9–14 Feb 1997, p. 182–187. Mexico, DF, CIMMYT.
 Duveiller, E. & Gilchrist, L. 1994. Productions constraints due to Bipolaris sorokiniana in wheat: current situation and future prospects. In D. Saunders & G. Hettel, eds. Proc. Wheat in the Warmer Areas, Rice/Wheat Systems, Nashipur, Dinajpur, Bangladesh, 13–16 Feb 1993, p. 343–352. Mexico, DF, CIMMYT/UNDP.
  CABI ISC 20001003003.
 Duveiller, E., García, I., Toledo, J., Franco, J., Crossa, J. & Lopez, F. 1998b. Evaluation of resistance to spot blotch of wheat in Mexico: improvement of disease assessment in the field and under controlled conditions. In E. Duveiller, H.J. Dubin, J. Reeves & A. McNab, eds. Proc. Int. Workshop Helminthosporium Diseases of Wheat: Spot Blotch and Tan Spot, CIM-MYT, El Batan, Mexico, 9–14 Feb 1997, p. 171–181. Mexico, DF, CIMMYT.
 Evans, C.K., Hunger, R.M. & Siegerist, W.C. 1996. Inoculum density and infection efficiency and conidiophores of Isolates of Pyrenophora tritici-repentis. Plant Dis., 80: 505–512.
 Fernandez, M., DePauw, R.M., Clarcke, J.M., Zentner, R.P. & McConkey, B.G. 1998. Tan spot in western Canada. In E. Duveiller, H.J. Dubin, J. Reeves & A. McNab, eds. Proc. Int. Workshop Helminthosporium Diseases of Wheat: Spot Blotch and Tan Spot, CIMMYT, El Batan, Mexico, 9–14 Feb 1997, p. 369–373. Mexico, DF, CIMMYT.
 Francl, L. 1997. Local and mesodistance dispersal of Pyrenophora tritici-repentis conidia. Can. J. Plant Pathol., 19: 247–255.
 Franco, J., Duveiller, E., Crossa, J. & García, I. 1998. New approach for clustering breeding genotypes using production variables, yield losses, and a double digit disease scale: application to the assessment of spot blotch resistance from a non replicated trial. In E. Duveiller, H.J. Dubin, J. Reeves & A. McNab, eds. Proc. Int. Workshop Helminthosporium Diseases of Wheat: Spot Blotch and Tan Spot, CIMMYT, El Batan, Mexico, 9–14 Feb 1997, p. 206–212. Mexico, DF, CIMMYT.
 Gilbert, J., Woods, S.M. & Tekauz A. 1998. Relationship between environmental variables and tillage systems and the incidence and severity of leaf-spotting diseases of spring wheat in southern Manitoba. In E. Duveiller, H.J. Dubin, J. Reeves & A. McNab, eds. Proc. Int. Workshop Helminthosporium Diseases of Wheat: Spot Blotch and Tan Spot, CIM-MYT, El Batan, Mexico, 9–14 Feb 1997, p. 333–338. Mexico, DF, CIMMYT.
 Hait, G.N. & Sinha, A.K. 1986. Protection of wheat seedlings from Helminthosporium infection by seed treatment with chemicals. J. Phytopathol., 115: 97–107.
 Hetzler, J., Eyal, Z., Mehta, Y.R., Campos, L.A., Fehrmann, H., Kushnir, U., Zekaria-Oren, J. & Cohen, L. 1991. Interactions between spot blotch (Cochliobolus sativus) and wheat cultivars. In D.A. Saunders & G. Hettel, eds. Proc. Wheat for Nontraditional Warm Areas. Proc. Int. Conf., Foz do Iguazu, Brazil, 29 Jul.-3 Aug 1990, p. 146–164. Mexico, DF, UNDP/CIMMYT.
 Hobbs, P.R. & Giri, G.S. 1997. Reduced and zero tillage options for establishment of wheat after rice in South Asia. In H-J. Braun et al., eds. Wheat: prospects for global improvement, p. 455–465. Dordrecht, Netherlands, Kluwer Academic.
 Hobbs, P.R., Harrington, L.W., Adhikary, C., Giri, G.S., Upadhyay, S.R. & Adhikary, B. 1996. Wheat and rice in the Nepal Tarai: farm resources and production practices in Rupandehi district. Mexico, DF, Nepal, CIMMYT, NARC.
 Huber, D.M., Lee, T.S., Ross, M.A. & Abney, T.S. 1987. Amelioration of tan spot-infected wheat with nitrogen. Plant Dis., 71: 49–50.
 Kohli, M.M., Mehta, Y.R. & de Ackermann, M.D. 1992. Spread of tan spot in the Southern cone region of South America. In L.J. Francl, J.M. Krupinsky & M.P McMullen, eds. Advances in Tan Spot Research, Proc. 2nd Int. Tan Spot Workshop, 25–26 Jun 1992, p. 86–90. Fargo, ND, USA, NDSU.
 Krupinsky, J.M. 1992a. Grass hosts of Pyrenophora tritici-repentis. Plant Dis., 74: 92–95.
 Krupinsky, J.M. 1992b. Collection of conidia and ascospores Pyrenophora tritici-repentis from wheat straw. In L.J. Francl, J.M. Krupinsky & M.P. McMullen, eds. Advances in Tan Spot Research, Proc. 2nd Int. Tan Spot Workshop, 25–26 Jun 1992, p. 91–97. Fargo, ND, USA, NDSU.
 Krupinsky, J., Halvorson, A.D. & Black, A.L. 1998. Leaf spot diseases on wheat in a conservation tillage study. In E. Duveiller, H.J. Dubin, J. Reeves & A. McNab, eds. Proc. Int. Workshop Helminthosporium Diseases of Wheat: Spot Blotch and Tan Spot, CIMMYT, El Batan, Mexico, 9–14 Feb 1997, p. 322–326. Mexico, DF, CIMMYT.
 Kumar U, A. K. Joshi, S. Kumar, R. Chand and M. S. Röder, 2010 Mapping of quantitative trait loci and identification of diagnostic markers for resistance to spot blotch caused by Bipolaris sorokiniana in wheat (T. aestivum L.) lines 'Ning 8201' and 'Chirya 3'. Molecular Breeding Online first
 Kumar U, A. K. Joshi, S. Kumar, R. Chand and M. S. Röder, 2009 Mapping of resistance to spot blotch disease caused by Bipolaris sorokiniana in spring wheat. Theoretical and Applied Genetics 118:783–792.
 Lamari, L. & Bernier, C.C. 1989. Toxin of Pyrenophora tritici-repentis: host specificity, significance in disease, and inheritance of host reactions. Phytopathology, 79: 740–744.
 Lamari, L. & Bernier, C.C. 1994. Temperature-induced resistance to tan spot [Pyrenophora tritici-repentis] of wheat. Can. J. Plant Pathol., 16: 279–286.
 Lamari, L. & Sayoud, R. 1997. Pathotype and race concepts in Pyrenophora tritici-repentis. In 3rd Int. Tan Spot Workshop. 10–11 Jul 1997, abstr. p. 8. Winnipeg, Canada, University of Manitoba.
 Lamari, L., Sayoud, R., Boulif, M. & Bernier, C.C. 1995. Identification of a new race in Pyrenophora tritici-repentis: implication for the current pathotype classification system. Can. J. Plant Pathol., 17: 312–318.
 Ledingham, R.J., Atkinson, T.G., Horricks, J.S., Mills, J.T., Piening, L.J. & Tinline, R.D. 1973. Wheat losses due to common root rot in the prairies of Canada, 1969–71. Can. Plant Dis. Surv., 53: 113–122.
 Loughman, R., Wilson, R.E., Roake, J.E., Platz, G.J., Rees, R.G. & Ellison, F.W. 1998. Crop management and breeding for control of Pyrenophora tritici-repentis causing yellow spot of wheat in Australia. In E. Duveiller, H.J. Dubin, J. Reeves & A. McNab, eds. Proc. Int. Workshop Helminthosporium Diseases of Wheat: Spot Blotch and Tan Spot, CIMMYT, El Batan, Mexico, 9–14 Feb 1997, p. 10–17. Mexico, DF, CIMMYT.
 Maraite, H. & Weyns, J. 1982. Observations d'une épidémie de Pyrenophora tritici-repentis (Died.) Drechs. Sur froment en Belgique. Premières données sur le cycle de développement, le pouvoir pathogène et la sensibilité aux fongicides. Med. Fac. Landbouww. Rijksuniv. Gent., 47: 913–924.
 Maraite, H., Di Zinno, T., Longrée, H., Daumerie, V. & Duveiller, E. 1998. Fungi associated with foliar blight of wheat in warm areas. In E. Duveiller, H.J. Dubin, J. Reeves & A. McNab, eds. Proc. Int. Workshop Helminthosporium Diseases of Wheat: Spot Blotch and Tan Spot, CIMMYT, El Batan, Mexico, 9–14 Feb 1997, p. 293–300. Mexico, DF, CIMMYT.
 McMullen, M.P. & Hosford, D.R. 1989. Tan spot of wheat. NDSU extension service PP-766. Fargo, ND, USA. 3 pp.
 McMullen, M.P. & Nelson, D.R. 1992. Tan spot and five years of wheat disease survey. In L.J. Francl, J.M. Krupinsky & M.P. McMullen, eds. Advances in tan spot research, p. 80–85. NDSU Agric. Exp. Sta. Publ. 146 pp.
 Mehta, Y.R. 1993. Spot blotch. In S.B. Mathur & B.M. Cunfer, eds. Seedborne diseases and seed health testing of wheat, p. 105–112. Copenhagen, Denmark, Jordburgsforlaget.
 Misra, A.P. 1973. Helminthosporium species occurring on cereals and other gramineae. Dholi, Muzzarfapur Bihar, India, Trihut College of Agriculture. 288 pp.
 Morrall, R.A.A. & Howard, R.J. 1975. The epidemiology of leaf spot disease in a native prairie II Airborne spore populations of Pyenophora tritici-repentis. Can. J. Bot., 53: 2345–2353.
 Mujeeb-Kazi, A. 1998. Alien genetic diversity for bread wheats resistant to Helminthosporium sativum (Cochliobolus sativus): current status and future projections. In E. Duveiller, H.J. Dubin, J. Reeves & A. McNab, eds. Proc. Int. Workshop Helminthosporium Diseases of Wheat: Spot Blotch and Tan Spot, CIM-MYT, El Batan, Mexico, 9–14 Feb 1997, p. 223–229. Mexico, DF, CIMMYT.
 Nagarajan, S. & Kumar, J. 1998. Foliar blights of wheat in India: germplasm improvement and future challenges for sustainable high yielding wheat production. In E. Duveiller, H.J. Dubin, J. Reeves & A. McNab, eds. Proc. Int. Workshop Helminthosporium Diseases of Wheat: Spot Blotch and Tan Spot, CIM-MYT, El Batan, Mexico, 9–14 Feb 1997, p. 52–58. Mexico, DF, CIMMYT.
 Orolaza, N.P., Lamari, L. & Ballance, G.M. 1995. Evidence of a host-specific chlorosis toxin from Pyrenophora tritici-repentis, the causal agent of tan spot of wheat. Phytopathology, 85: 1282–1287.
 Osorio, L., García, I., Lopez, F. & Duveiller, E. 1998. Improving the control of tan spot caused by Pyrenophora tritici-repentis in the Mixteca Alta of Oaxaca, Mexico. In E. Duveiller, H.J. Dubin, J. Reeves & A. McNab, eds. Proc. Int. Workshop Helminthosporium Diseases of Wheat: Spot Blotch and Tan Spot, CIMMYT, El Batan, Mexico, 9–14 Feb 1997, p. 142–145. Mexico, DF, CIMMYT.
 Platt, H.W. & Morrall, R.A.A. 1980a. Effects of light intensity and relative humidity on conidiation of Pyrenophora tritici-repentis. Can. J. Plant Pathol., 2: 53–57.
 Platt, H.W. & Morrall, R.A.A. 1980b. Effects of windspeed and humidity on conidiation of Pyrenophora tritici-repentis. Can. J. Plant Pathol., 2: 58–64.
 Raemaekers, R.H. 1991. First occurrence in nature of Cochliobolus sativus, the teleomorph of Bipolaris sorokiniana. In Contribution to the epidemiology of Bipolaris sorokiniana diseases and the development of rainfed wheat, a new crop in Zambia, p. 70–85, Chap. 6, Dissertationes de Agricultura, Fac. der Landbouwwetenschappen, Katholieke Universiteit te Leuven, Belgium.
 Rees, R.G. & Platz, G.J. 1980. The epidemiology of yellow spot of wheat in southern Quesnland. Austr. J. Agric. Res., 31: 259–267.
 Rees, R.G. & Platz, G.J. 1983. Effects of yellow spot on wheat: comparison of epidemics at different stages of crop development. Austr. J. Agric. Res., 34: 39–46.
 Rees, R.G. & Platz, G.J. 1992. Tan spot and its control – some Australian experiences. In L.J. Francl, J.M. Krupinsky & M.P. McMullen, eds. Advances in tan spot research, p. 1–15. NDSU Agric. Exp. Sta. Publ. 146 pp.
 Reis, E.M. 1991. Integrated disease management. The changing concepts of controlling head blight and spot blotch. In D.A. Saunders & G. Hettel, eds. Proc. Wheat for Nontraditional Warm Areas. Proc. Int. Conf., Foz do Iguazu, Brazil, 29 Jul.-3 Aug 1990, p. 165–177. Mexico, DF, UNDP/CIMMYT.
 Reis, E.M. & Forcelini, C.A. 1993. Transmissão de Bipolaris sorokiniana de sementes para orgaos radiculares e aéreos do trigo. Fitopatologia Brasileira, 18: 76–81.
 Reis, E.M., Madeiros, C. & Casa, R.T. 1998. Control of leaf blights of wheat by the elimination of the inoculum source. In E. Duveiller, H.J. Dubin, J. Reeves & A. McNab, eds. Proc. Int. Workshop Helminthosporium Diseases of Wheat: Spot Blotch and Tan Spot, CIMMYT, El Batan, Mexico, 9–14 Feb 1997, p. 327–332. Mexico, DF, CIMMYT.
 Ruckstuhl, M. 1998. Bipolaris sorokiniana: studies on its epidemiology and population structure in the rice-wheat cropping pattern of Nepal. In E. Duveiller, H.J. Dubin, J. Reeves & A. McNab, eds. Proc. Int. Workshop Helminthosporium Diseases of Wheat: Spot Blotch and Tan Spot, CIMMYT, El Batan, Mexico, 9–14 Feb 1997, p. 88–106. Mexico, DF, CIMMYT.
 Saari, E.E. & Hettel, G.P., eds. 1994. Guide to the CIMMYT wheat crop protection subprogram. Wheat Special Report No. 24. Mexico, DF, CIMMYT.
 Schilder & Bergstrom, G. 1993. Tan spot. In S.B. Mathur & B.M. Cunfer, eds. Seedborne diseases and seed health testing of wheat, p. 113–122. Copenhagen, Denmark, Jordburgsforlaget.
 Shabeer, A. & Bockus, W.W. 1990. In-heritance of resistance to tan spot in the wheat cultivar red chief. SABRAO J., 22: 97–101.
 Shah, D.N. & Fehrmann, H. 1992. Virulence patterns of geographically differing isolates of Pyrenophora tritici-repentis and sources of resistance in wheat. Plant Dis., 76: 712–716.
 Shaner, G. 1981. Effect of environment on fungal leaf blights of small grains. Annu. Rev. Phytopathol., 19: 273–296.
 Sharma, R.C. & Dubin, H.J. 1996. Effect of wheat cultivar mixtures on spot blotch (Bipolaris sorokiniana) and grain yield. Field Crops Res., 48: 95–101.
 Sharma, R.C., Dubin, H.J., Bhatta, M.R. & Devkota, R.N. 1997a. Selection for spot blotch resistance in four spring wheat populations. Crop Sci., 37: 432–435.
 Sharma, R.C., Dubin, H.J., Devkota, R.N. & Bhatta, M.R. 1997b. Heritability estimates of field resistance to spot blotch in four spring wheat crosses. Plant Breed., 116: 64–68.
 Spurr, H.W., Jr. & R.L., Kiesling. 1961. Field studies of parasitism by Helminthos-porium sorokiniana. Plant Dis. Rep., 45: 941–943.
 Stack, R.W. & McMullen, M. 1988. Root and crown rots of small grains. NDSU extension service PP-785. Fargo, ND, USA. 8 pp.
 Tinline, R.D., G.B., Wildermuth & Spurr, D.T. 1988. Inoculum density of Cochliobolus sativus in soil and common root rot of wheat cultivars in Queensland. Austr. J. Agric. Res., 39: 569–577.
 Tomas, A., Feng, G.H., Reeck, G.R., Bockus, W.W. & Leach, J.E. 1990. Purification of a cultivar specific toxin for Pyrenophora tritici-repentis causal agent of tan spot of wheat. Mol. Plant-Microbe Inter., 3: 221–224.
 Tuori, R.P., Wolpert, T.J. & Ciuffetti, L.M. 1995. Purification and immunological characterization of toxic components from cultures of Pyrenophora tritici-repentis. Mol. Plant-Microbe Inter., 8: 41–48.
 van Ginkel, M. & Rajaram, S. 1993. Breeding for durable resistance to diseases in wheat: an international perspective. In T. Jacobs & J.E. Parlevliet, eds. Durability of disease resistance, p. 259–272. Dordrecht, Netherlands, Kluwer Academic Publishers.
 van Ginkel, M. & Rajaram, S. 1998. Breeding for resistance to spot blotch in wheat: global perspective. In E. Duveiller, H.J. Dubin, J. Reeves & A. McNab, eds. Proc. Int. Workshop Helminthosporium Diseases of Wheat: Spot Blotch and Tan Spot, CIMMYT, El Batan, Mexico, 9–14 Feb 1997, p. 162–170. Mexico, DF, CIMMYT.
 Velázquez, C. 1994. Genetica de la resistencia a Bipolaris sorokiniana en trigos harineros. M.Sc. thesis. Montecillo, Mexico, Colegio de Postgraduados 84 pp.
 Viedma de, L. & Kohli, M.M. 1998. Spot blotch and tan spot of wheat in Paraguay. In E. Duveiller, H.J. Dubin, J. Reeves & A. McNab, eds. Proc. Int. Workshop Helminthosporium Diseases of Wheat: Spot Blotch and Tan Spot, CIMMYT, El Batan, Mexico, 9–14 Feb 1997, p. 126–133. Mexico, DF, CIMMYT.
 Villareal, R. & Mujeeb-Kazi, A. 1996 Exploitation of synthetic hexaploids (Triticum turgidum x T. tauschii) for some biotic resistances in wheat. In R.A. Richards, C.W. Wrigley, H.M. Rawson, G.J. Rebetzke, J.L. Davidson & R.I.S. Brettell, eds. Proc. 8th Ass. Wheat Breeding Society of Australia, 29 Sept.-4 Oct 1996, p. 185–188. Canberra, Australia, Australian National University.
 Wilson, R.E. & Loughman, R. 1997. Breeding for resistance to Pyrenophora tritici-repentis in western Australia. In 3rd Int. Tan Spot Workshop. 10–11 Jul 1997, abstr. p. 10. Winnipeg, Canada, University of Manitoba.
 Xiao, Z., Sun, L. & Xin, W. 1998. Breeding for resistance in Heilongjiang province, China. In E. Duveiller, H.J. Dubin, J. Reeves & A. McNab, eds. Proc. Int. Workshop Helminthosporium Diseases of Wheat: Spot Blotch and Tan Spot, CIMMYT, El Batan, Mexico, 9–14 Feb 1997, p. 114–118. Mexico, DF, CIMMYT.
 Zhang, X., Haley, S. & Jin, Y. 1998. Repeatability of tan spot resistance evaluation in wheat. In E. Duveiller, H.J. Dubin, J. Reeves & A. McNab, eds. Proc. Int. Workshop Helminthosporium Diseases of Wheat: Spot Blotch and Tan Spot, CIM-MYT, El Batan, Mexico, 9–14 Feb 1997, p. 202–205. Mexico, DF, CIMMYT.
 Zillinsky, F. 1983. Common diseases of small grain cereals, a guide to identification. Mexico, DF, CIMMYT. 141 pp.

Wheat diseases
Fungal plant pathogens and diseases
Leaf diseases